Basketball at the 2010 South American Games in Medellín was held from March 20 to March 29. All games were played at Coliseo Iván de Bedout.

Medal summary

Medal table

Men

First round

5th/6th Placement

Bronze-medal match

Gold-medal match

Women

Group stage

Group A

Group B

Semifinals

Bronze-medal match

Gold-medal match

References 

2009–10 in South American basketball
basketball
2010
International basketball competitions hosted by Colombia